Datuk Awang bin Hashim is a Malaysian politician who has served as the Member of Parliament (MP) for Pendang since May 2018. He served as the Deputy Minister of Human Resources for the second term in the Barisan Nasional (BN) administration under former Prime Minister Ismail Sabri Yaakob and former Minister Saravanan Murugan from August 2021 to the collapse of the BN administration in November 2022 and the first term in the Perikatan Nasional (PN) administration under former Prime Minister Muhyiddin Yassin and former Minister Saravanan from March 2020 to the collapse of the PN administration in August 2021. He is a member of the Malaysian Islamic Party (PAS), a component party of the PN coalition.

Election results

Honours
  :
  Knight Commander of the Order of the Territorial Crown (PMW) – Datuk (2021)

References

Malaysian Muslims
Malaysian people of Malay descent
Malaysian Islamic Party politicians
Members of the Dewan Rakyat
21st-century Malaysian politicians
Year of birth missing (living people)
Living people